Clara Jeffery (born August 25, 1967) is the editor in chief of Mother Jones.

Career
Jeffery was born in Baltimore, Maryland and was raised in Arlington, Virginia, and attended the Sidwell Friends School (1985), before going to Carleton College (1989). She earned a Master's degree from the Medill School of Journalism at Northwestern University in 1993.

Between 1993 and 1995, Jeffery was a staff editor and writer at Washington City Paper.  She was a senior editor at Harper's Magazine (1995–2002), where she edited six articles nominated for a National Magazine Award, including essays by Barbara Ehrenreich that became Nickel and Dimed. She became deputy editor of Mother Jones, a position she held for four years, and was promoted to co-editor in August 2006. Jeffery was promoted to editor-in-chief in May, 2015.

Together, Jeffery and Monika Bauerlein have aimed to put greater emphasis on staff-generated, daily news and original reporting. The magazine received a National Magazine Award for General Excellence in 2008 and 2010. In 2012 Mother Jones broke the story about Mitt Romney's "47 percent" remarks, which were controversial prior to Barack Obama winning reelection.

In 2002, Jeffery wrote an article on the Salton Sea for Harper's Magazine, "Go West Old Man: Where the American Dream Goes Down the Drain".  She has also written for Slate, the Huffington Post, San Francisco Magazine, and the Chicago Reporter.

References

External links
 "Ten Young Editors To Watch," by Ana Marie Cox, Columbia Journalism Review 
 "Power Sharing Women Take Over Mother Jones" Women's E-News

1967 births
Living people
American women journalists
American magazine editors
Carleton College alumni
Medill School of Journalism alumni
Mother Jones (magazine) people
Women magazine editors
21st-century American women